Bloomfield is a rural community in Kings County, New Brunswick, Canada. It is located mostly along Route 121.

History

Notable people

See also
List of communities in New Brunswick

Communities in Kings County, New Brunswick